Eresfjorden is a fjord in Molde Municipality in Møre og Romsdal county, Norway. The fjord begins at the mouth of the Eira River near the village of Eresfjord, and then it flows north to meet the Langfjorden near the villages of Eidsvåg and Boggestranda.

See also
 List of Norwegian fjords

References

Molde
Fjords of Møre og Romsdal